Hoskins is a surname, and may refer to:

 Allen Hoskins (1920–1980), American child actor who played Farina in the Our Gang series
 Andrew Hoskins (born 1975), Canadian rower
 Anthony Hoskins (1828–1901), Royal Navy admiral and First Sea Lord
 Basil Hoskins (1929–2005), British actor
 Bert Hoskins (1885–1968), British football forward and football manager
 Bob Hoskins (1942–2014), British actor
 Bob Hoskins (American football) (born 1945), retired National Football League defensive tackle
 Brian Hoskins (born 1945), British meteorologist and climatologist
 Brian Hoskins (born 1943), British Red Arrows Captain
 Dave Hoskins (1925–1970), American baseball pitcher in the Negro leagues and Major League Baseball
 Derrick Hoskins (born 1970), American retired National Football League defensive back
 Eric Hoskins (born 1960), Canadian physician and politician
 George Hoskins (disambiguation)
 Gregory Hoskins, vocalist and guitarist with Gregory Hoskins and the Stickpeople, a 1990s Canadian folk rock band
 Harold K. Hoskins (1927–2012), US Air Force lieutenant colonel and Tuskegee Airman
 John Hoskins (disambiguation)
 Johnnie Hoskins 1892–1987), sports promoter believed by some to have invented motorcycle speedway
 Katherine Hoskins (1909–1988), American poet, short story writer and playwright
 Kerri Hoskins (born 1970), American model
 Melissa Hoskins (born 1991), Australian track and road racing cyclist
 Oregan Hoskins, South African rugby administrator
 Patricia Hoskins (born 1967), American basketball player
 Percy Hoskins (1904–1989), British reporter
 Phil Hoskins (born 1997), American football player
 Rhys Hoskins (born 1993), American professional baseball player
 Richard Hoskins (born 1964), British author and criminologist
 Roy Hoskins (1900–??), Australian rugby union player
 Sam Hoskins (born 1993), British footballer
 Samuel Elliott Hoskins (1799–1888), British physician
 Tessa Lynn Hoskins (born 1969), BS Attended Augsburg College, Minneapolis, Mn. double major with Bachelors of Science in Accounting \Finance, MBA Masters in Business Administration major in Management at The University of Mary Bismarck,Nd. in Accountant, Enrolled in Doctorate program in Industrial Psychology, unlicensed paleontologist, discovered and unearthed many ancient fossils in North Dakota, Paralegal and part time legal research for attorney and self represented in criminal civil and foreclosure cases, In 2017, Win a successful  Federal appeal in illegal sentence enhancements made retro active in United States vs S.L.P 2017. 
 Theodore Hoskins (born 1938), American politician
 Tom Hoskins (1864–1934), British-born Australian politician
 Will Hoskins (born 1986), British association football striker
 William Hoskins (disambiguation), multiple people, including:
 William Hoskins (actor) (1816–1887), career in England, Australia and New Zealand
 William Hoskins (baseball) (1914–1975), American Negro league baseball player
 William Hoskins (inventor) (1862–1934), American co-inventor of nichrome and modern billiard chalk
 William Hoskins (MP) for Westbury in 1555
 William George Hoskins (1908–1992), British local historian, academic and author
 [Evan Hoskins  born 2013
William Lawrence Hoskins]] (1828–1901), American politician

See also
 Hoskyns, surname
 Hoskin, surname
 Haskins (surname)

English-language surnames